Ahmet Tuna Kozan (born 1943) is a Turkish former footballer. He competed in the men's tournament at the 1960 Summer Olympics.

References

External links
 
 

1943 births
Living people
Turkish footballers
Olympic footballers of Turkey
Footballers at the 1960 Summer Olympics
People from Elazığ Province
Association football midfielders
Karşıyaka S.K. footballers
Galatasaray S.K. footballers
Bursaspor footballers
Sivasspor footballers